There are 174 listed buildings (Swedish: byggnadsminne) in Stockholm County.

Botkyrka Municipality

Danderyd Municipality

Ekerö Municipality
placeholder

Haninge Municipality
placeholder

Järfälla Municipality
placeholder

Lidingö Municipality
placeholder

Nacka Municipality
placeholder

Norrtälje Municipality
placeholder

Nynäshamn Municipality
placeholder

Salem Municipality
placeholder

Sigtuna Municipality
placeholder

Solna Municipality
placeholder

Stockholm Municipality
placeholder

Sundbyberg Municipality
placeholder

Södertälje Municipality
placeholder

Tyresö Municipality
placeholder

Täby Municipality
placeholder

Upplands Bro Municipality
placeholder

Upplands Väsby Municipality
placeholder

Vaxholm Municipality
placeholder

Värmdö Municipality
placeholder

Österåker Municipality
placeholder

External links

  Bebyggelseregistret